Varamin County is in Tehran province, Iran. The capital of the county is the city of Varamin. At the 2006 census, the county's population was 540,442 in 134,538 households. The following census in 2011 counted 526,294 people in 140,183 households, by which time Pishva District had been separated from the county to become Pishva County. At the 2016 census, the county's population was 283,742 in 85,516 households, by which time Qarchak District had been separated from the county to form Qarchak County.

Administrative divisions

The population history and structural changes of Varamin County's administrative divisions over three consecutive censuses are shown in the following table. The latest census shows two districts, four rural districts, and two cities.

References

 

Counties of Tehran Province